SK Libeň was a Czech football club located in the cadastral area of Libeň in the city of Prague and founded in 1903. The club played seven seasons of top-flight football in the Czechoslovak era, taking part in the inaugural season of the Czechoslovak First League. The club's last season in the top flight was in the 1946–47 Czechoslovak First League. The club merged with Bratrství Sparta in 1951 and became defunct.

Historical names 
 1903: SK Libeň
 1948: Sokol Libeň
 1949: ČKD Sokolovo Libeň
 1951: Merged with Bratrství Sparta

References

Defunct football clubs in the Czech Republic
Association football clubs established in 1903
Czechoslovak First League clubs
Football clubs in Prague
1903 establishments in Austria-Hungary
20th-century establishments in Bohemia
Football clubs in Czechoslovakia
Association football clubs disestablished in 1951
Football clubs in Austria-Hungary